Gorokhovka is a rural locality (a selo) and the administrative center of Gorokhovskoye Rural Settlement, Verkhnemamonsky District, Voronezh Oblast, Russia. The population was 1,284 as of 2010. There are 15 streets.

Geography 
Gorokhovka is located 19 km southwest of Verkhny Mamon (the district's administrative centre) by road. Derezovka is the nearest rural locality.

References 

Rural localities in Verkhnemamonsky District